KhK Lokomotiv Orenburg is a bandy club in Orenburg, Russia, established in 1937. The club has earlier been playing in the Russian Bandy Super League, the top-tier of Russian bandy. The home games are played at Stadium Orenburg in Orenburg. The club colours are red, white and blue.

References

Bandy clubs in Russia
Bandy clubs in the Soviet Union
Sport in Orenburg
Bandy clubs established in 1937
1937 establishments in Russia